Baan may refer to:

People 
Baan (surname), a Dutch surname, including a list of people with the name
Huda al-Baan (born 1960), Yemeni politician
László Baán (born 1961), Hungarian economist and museum curator

Other uses
Baan Corporation, a Dutch software company 1978–2003
Baan language, an Ogoni language of Nigeria
Baan theatre, a theater in Assam, India
Baan, a hamlet in Altena, North Brabant, Netherlands

See  also 

  (Lao, baan 'village')
  (Thai, ban 'some')